Filipo Palako Vaka (born 4 January 1970) is a Tongan boxer. He competed in the men's middleweight event at the 1988 Summer Olympics.

References

External links
 

1970 births
Living people
Middleweight boxers
Tongan male boxers
Olympic boxers of Tonga
Boxers at the 1988 Summer Olympics
Place of birth missing (living people)